Adebayo Simeon Bamire (born 18 January 1959) is a Nigerian academic and professor of agricultural economics who is the 12th substantial Vice Chancellor of Obafemi Awolowo University, Ile-Ife, since 2022. He previously served as deputy vice chancellor academics.

Early life and education 
Bamire is from Oyan in Odo-Otin Local Government Area, Osun State, Nigeria. He started his education in Datus Preparatory School, Accra, Ghana and moved to St. Charles’ Grammar School, Osogbo for his secondary school between 1972 - 1976. He was admitted into the then University of Ife (now Obafemi Awolowo University, Ile-Ife) to study agricultural economics in the Faculty of Agriculture where he completed his first, second and third degrees; Bachelor of Agriculture in 1985, M.Phil., in 1992, and PhD in 1999 respectively.

Academic career 
Bamire started his academic career in the Department of Agricultural Economics as Assistant lecturer in 1992 and became a Professor in 2008. He was a visiting Scientist at the International Institute of Tropical Agriculture (IITA), Ibadan; the Vice-Dean, Faculty of Agriculture, Obafemi Awolowo University in the 2007/2008 & 2008/2009 academic sessions; the head of the Department of Agricultural Economics for the 2010/2011 academic session and the immediate past dean of the Faculty of Agriculture, Obafemi Awolowo University, Ile-Ife. He also served as the dean between 1st August, 2013 and 31st July, 2015.

Bamire is a member of the Nigerian Association of Agricultural Economists (NAAE) and Leadership for Environment & Development (LEAD). He is also a member of the Drought Tolerant Maize for Africa Project and Agribenchmark based in Germany.

Personal life
Bamire is married to Felicia Bosede Bamire and they have four children.

References

1959 births
Living people
Nigerian academic administrators
Obafemi Awolowo University alumni
Nigerian academics
People from Osun State
Academic staff of Obafemi Awolowo University
University of Lagos alumni
Vice-Chancellors of Obafemi Awolowo University
Yoruba academics